Abdul Jalal Jalal is the Chief of Police of Kunar Province, Afghanistan.
Jalal was described as a reformer in The Enduring Ledger, the publication of the Public Affairs department of the Combined Security Transition Command.

References

Living people
Afghan police officers
Chiefs of police
Year of birth missing (living people)